These are the results of the Junior Women's Pair event at the 2010 Summer Youth Olympics.

Medalists

Schedule
All times are China Standard Time (UTC+8)

Results

Heats
Qualification Rules: 1-3->SA/B, 4..->R

Heat 1
August 15, 12:00

Heat 2
August 15, 11:40

Heat 3
August 15, 11:50

Repechage
Qualification Rules: 1-3->SA/B, 4..->out
August 16, 11:55

Semifinals A/B
Qualification Rules: 1-3->FA, 4..->FB

Semifinal A/B 1
August 17, 11:20

Semifinal A/B 2
August 17, 11:30

Finals

Final B
August 18, 11:00

Final A
August 18, 11:50

References
 Results Page

Rowing at the 2010 Summer Youth Olympics